George William Sykes-Kenworthy (born 1 October 1999) is an English semi-professional footballer who plays as a goalkeeper for Bradford (Park Avenue).

Career
Born in Huddersfield, Sykes-Kenworthy began playing for Bradford City at under-8 level, and signed a two-year professional contract in March 2018. Later that month he joined Stalybridge Celtic on loan, making 11 appearances in all competitions. His loan spell was intended by Bradford City to help the player's growth.

In May 2018 he was named Bradford City's 'Youth Team Player of the Year' for the 2017–18 season.

He signed a one-month loan deal with Stafford Rangers in December 2018. He made 5 league appearances.

In July 2019 he signed on loan for Guiseley. His loan ended in September 2019, with Bradford City manager Gary Bowyer saying he was considering sending him back out on loan. He made his senior debut for Bradford City later that month, in the EFL Trophy.

On 26 May 2020 it was announced that he was one of 10 players who would leave Bradford City when their contract expired on 30 June 2020.

On 15 October 2020 it was announced that he had joined Derby County, joining the club's under-23 side. On 14 June 2021 it was announced that he would leave Derby at the end of the season, following the expiry of his contract.

On 7 August 2021, after a series of games as a trialist, it was announced that he had signed a deal with Boston United for the 2021–22 season. 

On 4 December 2021, Sykes-Kenworthy signed for National League North side Bradford (Park Avenue). He was "ever-present" in the first team, and in January 2023 said he hoped one day to return to League football.

References

1999 births
Living people
English footballers
Bradford City A.F.C. players
Stalybridge Celtic F.C. players
Stafford Rangers F.C. players
Guiseley A.F.C. players
Association football goalkeepers
Derby County F.C. players
Boston United F.C. players
Bradford (Park Avenue) A.F.C. players